Andis Shala (born 15 November 1988) is a German footballer who most recently played as a forward for Chemnitzer FC. His father is former Croatia international Kujtim Shala.

Club career
Having begun career in the youth team at Hannover 96, Shala joined VfR Mannheim in January 2008 on a short-term deal.

Shala joined Dundee United in pre-season for the 2008–09 season, with manager Craig Levein calling him a "decent prospect" and stated that he had "high hopes for him". Shala arrived in mid June 2008 with fellow new signing Michael McGovern.

He made his debut as a substitute in an August 2008 Scottish League Cup match. He made his league debut in February 2009, and with his first touch of the ball, set up Lee Wilkie to score the equalising goal in a 1–1 draw against Inverness Caledonian Thistle. He was released by Dundee United in the summer of 2011.

Following his release, Shala returned to Germany to sign for Hallescher FC. After earning promotion to the 3. Liga in the 2011–12 season, he left Halle to sign for Carl Zeiss Jena in January 2013. Eighteen months later he signed for Berliner FC Dynamo.

He agreed the termination of his contract with Regionalliga Nordost side Chemnitzer FC in January 2022.

International career
Shala is of Kosovar Albanian descent. In late December 2009, Shala was the subject of interest from the Albania national team, with team manager Josip Kuže confirming he was intending to watch the player. In an interview for the Albanian newspaper Sporti Shqiptar, Shala stated his willingness to play for Albania, and stated that if he never got called up for the squad, that he would not consider playing for any other country.

Career statistics

References

External links

1988 births
Living people
Sportspeople from Gjakova
Footballers from Mannheim
Kosovo Albanians
German people of Albanian descent
German people of Kosovan descent
Association football forwards
German footballers
Kosovan footballers
Hannover 96 II players
VfR Mannheim players
Dundee United F.C. players
Hallescher FC players
FC Carl Zeiss Jena players
Berliner FC Dynamo players
SV Babelsberg 03 players
FC Rot-Weiß Erfurt players
Kickers Offenbach players
SV Waldhof Mannheim players
Chemnitzer FC players
3. Liga players
Regionalliga players
Scottish Premier League players
Shala (tribe)
German expatriate footballers
German expatriate sportspeople in Scotland
Expatriate footballers in Scotland